Xerochloa imberbis, commonly known as rice grass, grows along the tropical coasts of Australia from Karratha in Western Australia through to Cardwell in North Queensland.

External links
Online Field guide to Common Saltmarsh Plants of Queensland

Panicoideae